is a concept in the Japanese language translatable as "system of government", "sovereignty", "national identity, essence and character", "national polity; body politic; national entity; basis for the Emperor's sovereignty; Japanese constitution" or nation. The word is also a short form of the (unrelated) name for the National Sports Festival of Japan.

Etymology

Kokutai originated as a Sino-Japanese loanword from Chinese guoti ("state political system; national governmental structure"). According to the Hanyu Da Cidian, the oldest guoti usages are in two Chinese classic texts. The 2nd century BCE Guliang zhuan to the Spring and Autumn Annals glosses dafu as guoti metaphorically meaning "embodiment of the country". The 1st century CE Book of Han history of Emperor Cheng of Han used guoti to mean "laws and governance" of Confucianist officials.

Pre-1868

The historical origins of kokutai go back to pre-1868 periods, especially the Edo period ruled by the Tokugawa shogunate (1603–1868).

Aizawa Seishisai (会沢正志斎, 1782–1863) was an authority on Neo-Confucianism and leader of the Mitogaku (水戸学 "Mito School") that supported direct restoration of the Imperial House of Japan. He popularized the word kokutai in his 1825 Shinron (新論 "New Theses"), which also introduced the term Sonnō jōi ("revere the Emperor, expel the barbarians").

Aizawa developed his ideas of kokutai using the idea that the Japanese national myths in the Kojiki and Nihon Shoki were historical facts, believing that the Emperor was directly descended from the sun goddess Amaterasu-ōmikami. Aizawa idealized this divinely-ruled ancient Japan as a form of saisei icchi (祭政一致 "unity of religion and government") or theocracy. For early Japanese Neo-Confucian scholars, linguist Roy Andrew Miller (1982:93) says, "kokutai meant something still rather vague and ill defined. It was more or less the Japanese "nation's body" or "national structure".

From 1868 to 1945

From 1868 to 1890

Katō Hiroyuki (1836–1916) and Fukuzawa Yukichi (1835–1901) were Meiji period scholars who analyzed the dominance of Western civilization and urged progress for the Japanese nation.

In 1874, Katō wrote the Kokutai Shinron (国体新論 "New Theory of the National Body/Structure"), which criticized traditional Chinese and Japanese theories of government and, adopting Western theories of natural rights, proposed a constitutional monarchy for Japan. He contrasted between kokutai and seitai (政体 "government body/structure"). Brownlee explains.
The Kokutai-seitai distinction enabled conservatives to identify clearly as Kokutai, National Essence, the "native Japanese", eternal, and immutable aspects of their polity, derived from history, tradition, and custom, and focused on the Emperor. The form of government, Seitai, a secondary concept, then consisted of the historical arrangements for the exercise of political authority. Seitai, the form of government, was historically contingent and changed through time. Japan had experienced in succession direct rule by the Emperors in ancient times, then the rule of the Fujiwara Regents, then seven hundred years of rule by shōguns, followed by the allegedly direct rule of the Emperors again after the Meiji Restoration. Each was a seitai, a form of government. In this understanding, the modern system of government under the Meiji Constitution, derived this time from foreign sources, was nothing more than another form of Japanese government, a new seitai. The Constitution was nothing fundamental. (2000:5) 

Fukuzawa Yukichi was an influential author translator for the Japanese Embassy to the United States (1860). His 1875 "Bunmeiron no Gairyaku" (文明論の概略 "An Outline of a Theory of Civilization") contradicted traditional ideas about kokutai. He reasoned that it was not unique to Japan and that every nation could be said to have a kokutai "national sovereignty". While Fukuzawa respected the Emperor of Japan, he believed kokutai did not depend upon myths of unbroken descent from Amaterasu.

Meiji Constitution
The Constitution of the Empire of Japan of 1889 created a form of constitutional monarchy with the kokutai sovereign emperor and seitai organs of government. Article 4 declares that "the Emperor is the head of the Empire, combining in Himself the rights of sovereignty", uniting the executive, legislative, and judicial branches of government, although subject to the "consent of the Imperial Diet". This system utilized a democratic form, but in practice was closer to an absolute monarchy. The legal scholar Josefa López notes that under the Meiji Constitution, kokutai acquired an additional meaning.
 The Government created a whole perfect new cultural system around the Tennou [Emperor], and the kokutai was the expression of it. Moreover, the kokutai was the basis of the sovereignty. According to Tatsukichi Minobe, kokutai is understood as the "shape of the Estate" in the sense of "Tenno as the organ of the Estate", while the authoritarians gave the kokutai a mystical power. The Tennou was a "god" among "humans", the incarnation of the national morals. This notion of kokutai was extra-juridical, something more cultural than positive. (2006:n.p.)

This stemmed from drafter Itō Hirobumi's rejection of some European notions as unfit for Japan, as they stemmed from European constitutional practice and Christianity. The references to the kokutai were the justification of the emperor's authority through his divine descent and the unbroken line of emperors, and the unique relationship between subject and sovereign. The "family-state" element in it was given a great deal of prominence by political philosophy. Many conservatives supported these principles as central to Nihon shugi (Nihon gunkoku shugi, Japanese militarism), "Japanism", as an alternative to rapid Westernization.

Taishō Democracy
From the Xinhai Revolution to the enactment of the Peace Preservation Law (1911–1925), the most important pre-World War II democracy movement "Taishō Democracy" occurred. During the Taishō Democracy, the political theorist Sakuzō Yoshino (1878–1933) rejected Western democracy minshu shugi (民主主義 lit. "people rule principle/-ism") and proposed a compromise on imperial democracy minpon shugi (民本主義 "people based principle/-ism"). However, as Japanese nationalism grew, questions arose whether the kokutai emperor could be limited by the seitai government.

The Peace Preservation Law of 1925 forbade both forming and belonging to any organization that proposed altering the kokutai or the abolishment of private property, effectively criminalizing socialism, communism, republicanism, democracy and other anti-Tenno ideologies. The Tokkō ("Special Higher Police") was established as a type of Thought Police to investigate political groups that might threaten Tenno-centered social order of Japan.

Under the Public Safety Preservation Law
Tatsukichi Minobe (1873–1948), a professor emeritus of law at Tokyo Imperial University, theorized that under the Meiji Constitution, the emperor was an organ of the state and not a sacrosanct power beyond the state. This was regarded as lèse-majesté. Minobe was appointed to the House of Peers in 1932 but forced to resign after an assassination attempt and vehement criticisms that he was disloyal to the emperor.

Great efforts were made to foment a "Japanese spirit" even in popular culture, as in the promotion of the "Song of Young Japan."

Brave warriors united in justice
In spirit a match for a million –
Ready like the myriad cherry blossoms to scatter
In the spring sky of the Shōwa Restoration.

The national debates over kokutai led the Prime Minister Prince Fumimaro Konoe to appoint a committee of Japan's leading professors to deliberate the matter. In 1937, they issued the Kokutai no Hongi (国体の本義, "Cardinal Principles of the National Body/Structure," see Gauntlett and Hall 1949). Miller gives this description.
The document known as the Kokutai no Hongi was actually a pamphlet of 156 pages, an official publication of the Japanese Ministry of Education, first issued in March 1937 and eventually circulated in millions of copies throughout the home islands and the empire. It contained the official teaching of the Japanese state on every aspect of domestic policy, international affairs, culture, and civilization. (1982:92)

It clearly stated its purpose: to overcome social unrest and to develop a new Japan. From this pamphlet, pupils were taught to put the nation before the self, and that they were part of the state and not separate from it. It also instructed them in the principle of hakkō ichiu ("eight cords, one roof"), which would be used to justify imperialism.

Brownlee concludes that after the Kokutai no Hongi proclamation,
It is clear that at this stage in history, they were no longer dealing with a concept to generate spiritual unity like Aizawa Seishisai in 1825, or with a political theory of Japan designed to accommodate modern institutions of government, like the Meiji Constitution. The committee of professors from prestigious universities sought to define the essential truths of Japan, which might be termed religious, or even metaphysical, because they required faith at the expense of logic and reason. (2006:13) 

The Ministry of Education promulgated it throughout the school system.

By 1937, "election purification", originally aimed at corruption, required that no candidate set the people in opposition to either the military or the bureaucracy. This was required because voters were required to support imperial rule.

Some objections to the founding of the Taisei Yokusankai or Imperial Rule Assistance Association, came on the grounds that kokutai already required all imperial subjects to support imperial rule. Conservative thinkers voiced concerns that the establishment of an empowered class of aides to the emperor was akin to the creation of a new shogunate.

For the leaders of Japan's "fascist-nationalist clique", writes Miller (1982:93), "kokutai had become a convenient term for indicating all the ways in which they believed that the Japanese nation, as a political as well as a racial entity, was simultaneously different from and superior to all other nations on earth."

This term, and what it meant, were widely inculcated in propaganda. The final letters of kamikaze pilots expressed, above all, that their motivations were gratitude to Japan and to its Emperor as the embodiment of kokutai. A sailor might give his life to save the picture of the Emperor on a submarine.

During World War II, intellectuals at an "overcoming modernity" conference proclaimed that prior to the Meiji Restoration, Japan has been a classless society under a benevolent emperor, but the restoration had plunged the nation into Western materialism (an argument that ignored commercialism and ribald culture in the Tokugawa era), which had caused people to forget their nature, which the war would enable them to reclaim.

"Japanist" unions endeavoured to win support by disavowing violence and pledging support for nation and emperor. Nevertheless, because of the mistrust of unions in such unity, the Japanese went to replace them with "councils" in every factory, containing both management and worker representatives to contain conflict. Like the Nazi councils they were copying, this was part of a program to create a classless national unity.

Because many religions had figures that distracted from the central emperor, they were attacked, such as the Oomoto sect condemned for worshipping figures other than Amaterasu, and in 1939, the Religious Organization authorized the shutting down of any religion that did not conform to the Imperial Way, which the authorities promptly used.

Hirohito evoked the Kokutai in his surrender broadcast, which announced the Japanese acceptance of the Potsdam Declaration (unconditional surrender).

Post-1945
By the surrender of Japan in 1945, the significance of kokutai diminished. In autumn 1945, GHQ forbade circulation of the Kokutai no Hongi and repealed the Peace Preservation Law (15 October 1945). By the enactment of the Constitution of the State of Japan (3 May 1947), Tenno's sovereignty and the lèse-majesté were repealed.

Nevertheless, some authors, including Miller (1982:95), believe that traces of Japanese kokutai "are quite as vivid today as they ever were".

In the 21st century, Japanese nationalists, such as those affiliated with the Nippon Kaigi lobby, have begun using the phrase "kunigara" (国柄, "national character").

Notes 

See also 

An Investigation of Global Policy with the Yamato Race as Nucleus
Gekokujō
Imperial Rescript on Education
Japanese Historical Text Initiative
Hirohito surrender broadcast (Gyokuon-hōsō)
Kokuchūkai (Column of the Nation Society)
National Spiritual Mobilization Movement
Shinbutsu-shūgō
Socialist thought in Imperial Japan
Statism in Shōwa Japan
Uyoku dantai (Nationalist groups of Japan)
Yangmingism
Yasukuni Shrine

References 

 Brownlee, John S. "Four Stages of the Japanese Kokutai (National Essence)", 2000.
 Daikichi, Irokawa. The Culture of the Meiji Period. Princeton: Princeton University Press, 1970.
 Gauntlett, John Owen and Hall, Robert King. Kokutai no hongi: cardinal principles of the national entity of Japan. Cambridge, Massachusetts: Harvard University press, 1949.
 Kitagawa, Joseph M. "The Japanese Kokutai (National Community) History and Myth", History of Religions, Vol. 13.3 (Feb., 1974), pp. 209–226.
 Valderrama López, Josefa. "Beyond words: the "kokutai" and its background". Història Moderna i Contemporània, 2006. ISSN 1696-4403.
 Miller, Roy Andrew. Japan's Modern Myth. New York: Weatherhill, 1982.
 Antoni, Klaus Kokutai – Political Shintô from Early-Modern to Contemporary Japan. Eberhard Karls University Tuebingen, Tobias-lib 2016. . Open Access publication: 

Japanese nationalism
Japanese historical terms
Politics of the Empire of Japan
Shōwa Statism
Japanese words and phrases
Japanese mythology